Cebu City, officially the City of Cebu, is a 1st class highly urbanized city in the Central Visayas region of the Philippines. It is the capital of the Cebu Province, where it is geographically located but is one of three cities (together with Lapu-Lapu City and Mandaue City) that are administratively independent of the provincial government. According to the 2020 census, it has a population of 964,169 people, making it the sixth-most populated city in the nation and the most populous in the Visayas.

It also serves as the regional center of Central Visayas and its metropolitan area exerts influence on commerce, trade, industry, education, culture, tourism, and healthcare beyond the region, over the entire Visayas and partly over Mindanao. It is the Philippines' main domestic shipping port and is home to about 80% of the country's domestic shipping companies.

Cebu City is bounded on the north by the town of Balamban and the city of Danao, on the west by the city of Toledo, on the east by the cities of Lapu-Lapu and Mandaue and the towns of Liloan, Consolacion and Compostela and to the south by the city of Talisay. Located at the center of the eastern seaboard of Cebu Island, it is the core city of Metro Cebu, the second largest metropolitan area in the Philippines, which includes the cities of Carcar, Danao, Lapu-Lapu, Mandaue, Naga and Talisay and the municipalities (towns) of Compostela, Consolacion, Cordova, Liloan, Minglanilla and San Fernando. Metro Cebu had a total population of 3,165,799 as of the 2020 census, making it the third-most populous metropolitan area of the nation, after Metro Manila in Luzon and Metro Davao in Mindanao.

The current political boundaries of the city are an incorporation of the former municipalities of Cebu, San Nicolas, El Pardo, Mabolo, Talamban and Banilad in the Commonwealth period.

In the Precolonial period, the area of what is today Cebu was occupied by the Rajahnate of Cebu which was known to the Ming dynasty as the nation of Sokbu (束務). The capital of which was Singhapala (சிங்கப்பூர்) which is Tamil-Sanskrit for "Lion City", the same rootwords with the modern city-state of Singapore.

The city has experienced rapid economic growth since the 1990s, a phenomenon also known as "Ceboom". Owing to its economic importance and influence in modern times, Cebu City is also popularly referred to as the Queen City of the South.

Etymology
The name "Cebu" came from the old Cebuano word sibu or sibo ("trade"), a shortened form of sinibuayng hingpit ("the place for trading"). It was originally applied to the harbors of the town of Sugbu, the ancient name for Cebu City. Sugbu or Sugbo, in turn, was derived from the Old Cebuano term for "scorched earth" or "great fire".

History

Founding

Before the arrival of the Spaniards, Cebu City was part of the island-rajahnate and trade center of Pulua Kang Dayang or Kangdaya (literally "[the islands] which belong to Baya"), now better known as the Rajahnate of Cebu. It was founded by a prince of the Hindu Chola dynasty of Sumatra, the half-Malay and half-Tamil, Sri Lumay. The name Sugbo (shortened form of Kang Sri Lumaying Sugbo, literally "that of Sri Lumay's great fire") refers to Sri Lumay's scorched earth tactics against Muslim Pirates or Moro raiders (Magalos). The capital of the Cebu Rajahnate was called Singhapala on what is now modern day northern Cebu City.

Spanish period

On April 7, 1521, Portuguese explorer at the service of the Spanish Crown and leader of the first expedition to circumnavigate the world, Ferdinand Magellan, landed in Cebu. He was welcomed by Rajah Humabon (also known as Sri Humabon or Rajah Humabara), the grandson of Sri Lumay, together with his wife and about 700 native islanders. Magellan, however, was killed in the Battle of Mactan, and the remaining members of his expedition left Cebu soon after several of them were poisoned by Humabon, who was fearful of foreign occupation. The last ruler of Sugbo, prior to Spanish colonization, was Rajah Humabon's nephew, Rajah Tupas (d. 1565).

On February 13, 1565, Spanish and Novohispanic (Mexican) conquistadors led by Miguel López de Legazpi together with Augustinian friars whose prior was Andrés de Urdaneta, left New Spain (modern Mexico) and arrived in Samar, taking possession of the island thereafter. They Christianized some natives and Spanish remnants in Cebu. Afterwards, the expedition visited Leyte, Cabalian, Mazaua, Camiguin and Bohol where the famous Sandugo or blood compact was performed between López de Legazpi and Datu Sikatuna, the chieftain of Bohol on March 16, 1565. The Spanish arrived in Cebu on April 15, 1565. They then attempted to parley with the local ruler, Rajah Tupas, but found that he and the local population had abandoned the town. Rajah Tupas presented himself at their camp on May 8, feast of the Apparition of Saint Michael the Archangel, when the island was taken possession of on behalf of the Spanish King. The Treaty of Cebu was formalized on July 3, 1565. López de Legazpi's party named the new city "Villa de San Miguel de Cebú" (later renamed "Ciudad del Santísimo Nombre de Jesús)." In 1567 the Cebu garrison was reinforced with the arrival of 2,100 soldiers from New Spain (Mexico). The growing colony was then fortified by Fort San Pedro.

By 1569, the Spanish settlement in Cebu had become important as a safe port for ships from Mexico and as a jumping-off point for further exploration of the archipelago. Small expeditions led by Juan de Salcedo went to Mindoro and Luzon, where he and Martín de Goiti played a leading role in the subjugation of the Kingdoms of Tundun and Seludong in 1570. One year later, López de Legazpi departed Cebu to discuss a peace pact with the defeated Rajahs. An agreement between the conquistadors and the Rajahs to form a city council paved the way for the establishment of a new settlement and the construction of the Christian walled city of Intramuros on the razed remains of Islamic Manila, then a vassal-state of the Sultanate of Brunei.

In 1571, the Spanish carried over infantry from Mexico, to raise an army of Christian Visayan warriors from Cebu and Iloilo as well as mercenaries from the Tagalog region, and assaulted the Sultanate of Brunei in what is known as the Castilian War. The war also started the Spanish–Moro Wars waged between the Christian Visayans and Muslim Mindanao, wherein Moros burned towns and conducted slave raids in the Visayas islands and selling the slaves to the Sultanates of the Malay Archipelago and the Visayans fought back by establishing Christian fort-cities in Mindanao, cities such as Zamboanga City.

On August 14, 1595, Pope Clement VIII created the diocese of Cebu as a suffragan to the Archdiocese of Manila.

On April 3, 1898, local revolutionaries led by the Negrense Leon Kilat rose up against the Spanish colonial authorities and took control of the urban center after three days of fighting. The uprising was only ended by the treacherous murder of Leon Kilat and the arrival of soldiers from Iloilo and Manila. On December 26, 1898, the Spanish Governor, General Montero, evacuated his troops to Zamboanga, turning over government property to Pablo Mejia. The next day, a provincial government was formed under Luis Flores as president, General Juan Climaco as military chief of staff, and Julio Llorente as mayor.

American occupation and World War II

The signing of the Treaty of Paris at the end of the Spanish–American War provided for the cession of Cebu along with the rest of the Philippine Islands to the United States until the formation of the Commonwealth Era (1935–46). On February 21, 1899, the USS Petrel (PG-2) deployed a landing party of 40 marines on the shores of Cebu. Cebu's transfer to the American government was signed by Luis Flores although others, most notably General Arcadio Maxilom and Juan Climaco, offered resistance until 1901. Governor W. H. Taft visited Cebu on April 17, 1901, and appointed Julio Llorento as the first provincial governor. Juan Climaco was elected to that office in January 1904.

Cityhood

With its city status granted by the King of Spain in 1594 invalidated by the change of colonial administration, in 1934 the neighboring municipalities of El Pardo, Mabolo, Talamban, Banilad, and San Nicolas were dissolved and merged to become the chartered City of Cebu on February 24, 1937. These former towns were broken up into several barangays, including their town centers which assumed their names (in contrast, Manila and Iloilo preserved their incorporated towns as geo-political districts). Many other Philippine cities such as Dansalan (now Marawi), Iloilo City, and Bacolod were also incorporated at the same time (see Cities of the Philippines).

Japanese occupation
Along with the rest of the country, Cebu came under Japanese occupation during World War II. The Japanese encountered opposition from guerrillas and irregular forces led by Col. James Cushing and the Cebu Area Command. It was finally liberated with the Battle for Cebu City in March and April 1945. The military general headquarters of the Philippine Commonwealth Army and 8th Constabulary Regiment of the Philippine Constabulary, active from January 3, 1942, to June 30, 1946, was stationed in Cebu City during World War II.

Post-war years

The war virtually razed Cebu City to the ground. Reconstruction, however, had been rapid. The city's central business district, which had been confined largely around the port and the coast in the pre-war years, had expanded inland. Colon Street, the oldest national road in the Philippines, which was once a residential area in the pre-war years, became the center of a dense and compact area in downtown Cebu City, becoming home to many shopping and business activities, which included the city's most fashionable shops, restaurants, and movie houses. In 1962, construction of the Cebu City North Reclamation Area commenced, and finished in 1969, which expanded the port of Cebu and provided the city with more developable land close to the city center. During this time, Cebu had also become a prominent educational center for the Visayas and Mindanao regions and new schools were established in Cebu's uptown areas, such as the Talamban campus of the University of San Carlos.

During the Marcos dictatorship

Cebu became a key center of resistance against the Marcos dictatorship, first becoming apparent when the hastily put-together lineup of Pusyon Bisaya defeated the entire slate of Marcos' Kilusang Bagong Lipunan (KBL) in Region VII.

Among the Cebuanos immediately arrested by the Marcos dictatorship when Martial law was announced on September 23, 1972, were columnist and future National Artist Resil Mojares and human rights lawyer and Carcar Vice Mayor Democrito Barcenas, who were both detained at Camp Sergio Osmeña.

One of the Marcos Martial Law desaparecidos from Cebu was Redemptorist priest Fr. Rudy Romano, a prominent Marcos critic and executive secretary of Cebu's Coalition against People's Persecution, who was accosted by armed men in Tisa, Labangon, Cebu City, on June 11, 1985, and never seen again. Levi Ybañez, Romano's colleague in the Coalition against People's Persecution, was abducted on the same day as Fr. Romano, and was also never heard from again.

Later, Cebu would play a key role in the days leading up to the 1986 People Power revolution and the ouster of Marcos. It was from Fuente Osmeña circle in Cebu City that the opposition forces relaunched a civil disobedience campaign against the Marcos regime and its cronies on February 22, 1986. After that, the Carmelite Monastery in Barangay Mabolo, Cebu City, served as a refuge for opposition candidates Aquino and Laurel during the first day of the People Power revolution, because it was not yet safe to go back to Manila.

Economic boom and contemporary history

In 1990, Typhoon Ruping (international name Mike) hit Visayas and Cebu in particular, causing considerable damage to the infrastructure of the city and province. The typhoon cut off many of the city's communication lines, and was virtually cut from the outside, causing delays for aid from the national government in Manila. This forced local authorities to rethink governmental priorities, and enforced some radical measures, such as food, water, and fuel rations. However, the city quickly recovered, and by the end of the decade, it was experiencing rapid economic growth, dubbed Ceboom. The economic growth of the city also spread economic growth to its neighboring cities and municipalities, which spreads from Danao from the north all the way to Carcar to the south.

Within the city, economic growth was observed in other areas as well, and much of the business activity shifted from the old and derelict downtown area to the more modern and more diverse business districts located in other areas of the city, including areas around Fuente Osmeña (colloquially known as "Uptown Cebu"), the Cebu Business Park, and the Cebu IT Park, among other areas. The opening of the aforementioned Ayala Mall and SM City Cebu had also shifted significant retail activities away from Colon, though it remained to serve as an important transit point for public utility jeepneys (PUJ) covering arterial routes within the city.

In 2002, the South Road Properties (SRP) was completed, initially with the intention of being a hub for light industries but gradually shifted to be a hub for mixed-use developments. The Cebu South Coastal Road, which traverses through SRP, has helped alleviate the city's traffic by serving as an alternative to the Natalio Bacalso Avenue. SM Seaside City Cebu opened in 2015, and was one of the largest shopping malls in the Philippines upon opening. The opening of the Cebu–Cordova Link Expressway in 2022, which links the city to Cordova in Mactan, is poised to unlock the SRP's potential as the city's next economic hub. Other infrastructure projects, such as the Metro Cebu Expressway and the Cebu Bus Rapid Transit System, are also in place to help facilitate the city's future growth.

Geography

To the northeast of the city is Mandaue City and the town of Consolacion; to the west is Toledo City and the towns of Balamban and Asturias; to the south is Talisay City and the town of Minglanilla.

Across Mactan Strait to the east is Mactan island where Lapu-Lapu is located. Further east across the Cebu Strait is the island of Bohol.

Barangays 

The city comprises 80 barangays. These are grouped into two congressional districts, with 46 barangays in the northern district and 34 in the southern district.

As of the 2020 census, 58 barangays are classified as urban barangays where 888,481 (92.15%) of Cebu City's population lives, while the remaining 22 rural barangays are home to 75,668 residents, representing 7.85% of the total population.

The most populous barangays in the city, as of the 2020 census, are Guadalupe (70,039), Tisa (47,364), and Lahug (45,853), while Kalubihan is the least populous barangay with only 663 residents

Climate
Cebu City has a tropical monsoon climate under the Köppen climate classification. The city has a lengthy wet season and a short dry season, with only the months of March and April falling into the latter season.

Demographics

The population reached 799,762 people in 2007, and at the 2010 census, the city's population had grown to 866,171 in over 161,151 households.

The most recent census data on ethnicity (based on the 2010 census) shows that the vast majority of the city's population speaks Cebuano.

Religion

The city is considered the birthplace of Christianity in the Far East. The Roman Catholic Archdiocese of Cebu is currently the largest archdiocese in the Philippines and in Asia.

Christianity in the form of Roman Catholicism is the predominant religion in Cebu for about 80% of the population. The remainders are divided with various Protestant faiths (Baptists, Methodists, and Presbyterians), Non-denominational, the Philippine Independent Church, Iglesia Ni Cristo, the Church of Jesus Christ of Latter-day Saints, Jehovah's Witnesses, Seventh-day Adventist and other Christian groups. Other religions include Islam, Hinduism and Buddhism.

Within the city is the Cebu Taoist Temple, a Taoist temple located in the Beverly Hills subdivision of Lahug.

Economy

Ceboom, a portmanteau of "Cebu" and "boom", has been used to refer to the rapid economic development of both Cebu City and Cebu Province from the early 1990s to the early 2000s.

With Cebu City's proximity to many islands, beaches, hotel and resorts, diving locations, and heritage sites, high domestic and foreign tourist arrivals have fueled the city's tourism industry. Due to its geographic location in the middle of the country, accessibility by air, land and sea transportation, Cebu City has become the tourist gateway to central and southern Philippines. Its port, Port of Cebu, is the country's second largest seaport.

The city is a major hub for the business process outsourcing industry of the Philippines. In 2013, Cebu ranked 8th worldwide in the "Top 100 BPO Destinations Report" by global advisory firm Tholons. In 2012, the growth in IT-BPO revenues in Cebu grew 26.9 percent at $484 million, while nationally, the industry grew 18.2 percent at $13 billion.

Aboitiz Equity Ventures, formerly known as Cebu Pan Asian Holdings, is the first holding company from Cebu City publicly listed in the Philippine Stock Exchange. Ayala Corporation, through its subsidiary Cebu Holdings, Inc. and Cebu Property, both publicly in the PSE Index, developed the Cebu Park District where the mixed-used development zones of the Cebu Business Park and Cebu IT Park are located. Both master planned areas are host to regional headquarters for various companies in the banking, finance, IT and tourism sectors among others.

Shipbuilding companies in Cebu have manufactured bulk carriers of up to 70,000 metric tons deadweight (DWT) and double-hulled fast craft as well. This industry made the Philippines the 4th largest shipbuilding country in the world.

With a revenue growth rate of 18.8 percent in 2012, the real estate industry is the fastest growing sector in Cebu. With the strong economic indicators and high investors' confidence level, more condominium projects and hypermarkets are being developed in the locality.

The South Road Properties (SRP) is a  prime property development project on a reclaimed land located a few metres off the coast of Cebu's central business district. It is a mixed-use development that will feature entertainment, leisure, residential and business-processing industries. It is registered with the Philippine Economic Zone Authority (PEZA) and is funded by the Japan Bank for International Cooperation(JBIC).

Cebu City, and Metro Cebu as a whole, is one of the Philippines' major shopping destinations. The Gaisano family, which operates Gaisano Capital, Gaisano Grand Malls, Gaisano Malls, and the Metro Retail Stores Group, traces its roots to the city. There are four major super-regional malls in the city. SM City Cebu, located in the North Reclamation Area, opened in 1993, and is the first SM Supermall in the Philippines located outside Metro Manila. Ayala Center Cebu, opened in 1994, is a shopping mall at the Cebu Business Park. More than 85,000 people visit the mall every day, with the figure increasing to 135,000 daily on weekends. SM Seaside, opened in November 2015, is located in the South Road Properties and is one of the largest shopping malls in the Philippines. Robinsons Galleria Cebu opened in December 2015 and is in close proximity to the Port of Cebu. Other notable retail establishments include Ayala Malls Central Bloc in Cebu IT Park, Il Corso, Gaisano Mall of Cebu, and Gaisano Country Mall, among others.

Colon Street, the oldest national road in the Philippines, as well as its neighboring streets and surrounding areas, collectively known as Downtown Cebu, is an important center of commerce for the city. It is home to many malls, stores, and stalls selling various goods and services. Carbon Market is the city's oldest and largest farmer's market, and is set to be redeveloped to include other lifestyle and mixed-use developments. The redevelopment is scheduled to be finished by 2025. The Pasil Fish Market, located in Barangays Pasil and Suba, is a major fish wholesale market, sourcing fresh catch from different parts of the Visayas.

Government

Being a highly urbanized city, Cebu City (along with neighboring Mandaue and Lapu-Lapu) is independent from Cebu province. Its electorate do not vote for provincial officials. There were proposals during the time of Governor Emilio Mario Osmeña to establish an "administrative district" that would be independent from Cebu City. This would mean carving out Cebu City's Capitol Site barangay, where the provincial capitol and other provincial offices are located. The plan, however, did not go through and was even followed by other proposals like the transfer of the capital to Balamban.

Cebu City is governed by a mayor, vice mayor and sixteen councilors (eight representing the north and eight representing the south districts). Each official is popularly elected to serve for a three-year term. The chief of the Association of Barangay Captains and the president of the Sangguniang Kabataan Federation also serve in the city council. The day-to-day administration of the city is handled by a city administrator.

 Current city officials (2022–2025)
 Mayor: Michael L. Rama (BARUG)
 Vice Mayor: Raymond Alvin N. Garcia (BARUG)

 19th Congress
 House of Representatives
 1st District (North): Rachel B. del Mar (NPC)
 2nd District (South): Eduardo R. Rama Jr. (PDPLBN)

Culture

Cebu City is a significant cultural center in the Philippines. The imprint of Spanish and Roman Catholic culture is evident. The city's most famous landmark is Magellan's Cross. This cross, now housed in a chapel, is reputed to have been erected by Ferdinand Magellan (Fernão Magalhães) when he arrived in the Philippines in 1521. It was encased in hollow tindalo wood in 1835 upon the order of the Augustinian Bishop Santos Gómez Marañon to prevent devotees from taking it home chip by chip. The same bishop restored the present template or kiosk, located at Magallanes Street between the City Hall and Colegio del Santo Niño. Revered by Filipinos, the Magellan's Cross is a symbol of Christianity in the Philippines.

A few steps away from Magellan's Cross is the Basilica Minore del Santo Niño (Church of the Holy Child). This is an Augustinian church elevated to the rank of basilica in 1965 during the 400th anniversary celebrations of Christianity in the Philippines, held in Cebu. The church, which was the first to be established in the islands, is built of hewn stone and features the country's oldest relic, the figure of the Santo Niño de Cebú (Holy Child of Cebu), who is Jesus Christ as a Child.

This religious and cultural event is celebrated during the island's cultural festivities known as the Sinulog festival. Held every third Sunday of January, it celebrates the festival of the Santo Niño, who was formerly considered to be the patron saint of Cebu. (This patronage was later changed to that of Our Lady of Guadalupe after it was realized that the Santo Niño could not be a patron saint because he was an image of Christ and not a saint.) The Sinulog is a dance prayer ritual of pre-Hispanic indigenous origin. The dancer moves two steps forward and one step backward to the rhythmic sound of drums. This movement resembles somewhat the current (sulog) of the river. Thus, the Cebuanos called it Sinulog.

When the Spaniards arrived in Cebu, the Italian chronicler Antonio Pigafetta, sailing under convoy with the Magellan expedition, offered a baptismal gift to Hara Amihan, wife of Rajah Humabon. She was later named Juana, the figure of the Santo Niño. The natives also honored the Santo Niño de Cebú in their indigenous sinulog ritual. This ritual was preserved but limited to honoring the Santo Niño. Once the Santo Niño church was built in the 16th century, the Christianized-Austronesian natives started performing the sinulog ritual in front of the church, the devotees offering candles and indigenous dancers shouting "Viva Pit Señor!"

In the 1980s and 2000s, the city authorities of Cebu added the religious feast of Santo Niño de Cebú during the Sinulog Festival to its cultural event.

The city joined UNESCO's Network of Creative Cities as a Design City on October 31, 2019, on the occasion of World Cities' Day. Cebu City was also recognized by the British Council as the Creative Capital of the Philippines. In 2019, it joined the UNESCO Creative Cities Network as a City of Design.

Music
Cebu City is regarded as the birthplace of BisRock, a term coined by Cebuano writer Januar E. Yap in 2002. Notable BisRock bands include Missing Filemon, Junior Kilat, Phylum, and Scrambled Eggs, among others. Popular Filipino bands Urbandub and Cueshé also hail from Cebu, but mostly sing their songs in English, and in the latter's case, also in Tagalog.

The Cebu Reggae Festival is a popular Filipino Reggae and Roots music festival, it now has become one of the Philippines' largest annual Reggae Festivals.

Lifedance and Sinulog Invasion are rave music festivals held in the city in the days before the Sinulog Festival. These music festivals are regarded as among the biggest music festivals in the country.

The Cebu Pop Music Festival is an annual music festival, founded in 1980, showcasing Cebuano language pop songs. Like Lifedance and Sinulog Invasion, the music festival is also held in the days before the Sinulog Festival.

On Cebuano musical heritage, the Jose R. Gullas Halad Museum in V. Gullas St. (former Manalili) corner D. Jakosalem St. in Cebu City, holds musical memorabilia of Cebuano composers in the early 20th century, the likes of Ben Zubiri (composer of Matud Nila), Inting Rubi (Kasadya Ning Taknaa) and Minggoy Lopez (Rosas Pandan).

Since 2013, Cebu has hosted the Visayan Pop Songwriting Campaign, an annual songwriting competition that aimed to showcase songs written in the Cebuano language. Founded by multi-awarded artist Jude Gitamondoc, Ian Zafra, Cattski Espina, and Missing Filemon's front-man Lorenzo Niñal through the Artists and Musicians Marketing Cooperative (ArtistKo) with the support of the Filipino Society of Composers, Authors and Publishers. Vispop, or sometimes Visayan pop, later on evolved from being associated with the music festival to a genre of the new wave of Visayan pop songs that gained nationwide popularity, even those songs that were not exclusively produced for or presented in the contest.

Sports

The Cebu Schools Athletic Foundation, Inc. is based in the city. Its member schools are located within the Metro Cebu area. It is often considered one of the Philippines' strongest college sports league.

The city has an active boxing scene. ALA Gym, one of the most famous boxing gyms in the Philippines, is based in the city, at the Banilad district. In addition, ALA Gym's promotion arm, the ALA Promotions, organizes the Pinoy Pride boxing series.

The Aboitiz Football Cup is the longest-running association football competition in Cebu. The cup has been considered to be one of the most prestigious association football tournaments in the Philippines. The tournament is organized and supported by the Aboitiz family, one of the Philippines' richest families, and owners of one of the Philippines' largest conglomerates, the Aboitiz Equity Ventures.

The Cebu City Sharks is currently the only professional basketball team that is based in the city. The team plays in the South Division of the Maharlika Pilipinas Basketball League (MPBL). The team plays its home games at the Hoops Dome in nearby Lapu-Lapu and at the USJ-R Coliseum, located in Barangay Basak Pardo.

The Cebu F.C. is a professional football club in the Philippines Football League (PFL), and will begin play in 2021. The club is the second professional football club to be based in Cebu, after Global F.C., which also played in the PFL. The club plays its home games at the Dynamic Herb Sports Complex in nearby Talisay.

Former professional sports teams include the following:
 Global Cebu F.C., which played in the now-defunct Philippines Football League (PFL). They played their home games at the Cebu City Sports Complex. They have since moved to Makati, changing their name correspondingly into Global Makati F.C..
 Cebu City Chiefs, a rugby league team that participated in the Philippines National Rugby League
 Cebu Dragons, a rugby union team in the Philippine Rugby Football Union
 Cebu Gems, a basketball team that played in the now-defunct Metropolitan Basketball Association (MBA). The Gems played their home games at the Cebu Coliseum.

Tourism

Tourism is a thriving industry in Cebu. It hosted the 1998 ASEAN Tourism Forum. The city also hosted the East Asian Tourism Forum in August 2002, in which the province of Cebu is a member and signatory.

Views of Cebu City and its skyline can be seen from villages and numerous gated communities located on its mountainsides.

There is a significant number of Filipino-Spanish heritage buildings in Cebu City such as Fort San Pedro, Basilica del Santo Niño, Magellan's Cross, and the Cebu Metropolitan Cathedral. The city hosts the Museo Sugbo and Casa Gorordo Museum. The Cebu Taoist Temple is also situated within the city.

Infrastructure

Transportation

Mactan–Cebu International Airport, located in Lapu-Lapu, is the country's second-busiest airport and serves direct international flights to Hong Kong, Malaysia, Singapore, Japan, China, Taiwan, Dubai and South Korea, with charter flights to Russia and domestic destinations. Many international and cargo airlines fly to Cebu. There are also direct transfer flights via the capital's Ninoy Aquino International Airport that readily connect the city to other destinations in the world.

The city is served by a domestic and international port which are handled by the Cebu Port Authority. The city is home to more than 80% of the country's island vessels traveling on domestic routes mostly in the Visayas and Mindanao.

Transportation throughout the city and the metropolitan itself is provided by jeepneys, buses and taxis. The Cebu City Government conducted a 2012 feasibility study on implementing a bus rapid transit (BRT) system that will ease the transportation of the residents in the city and throughout the entire Metro Cebu area. Aimed to serve an estimated 330,000 passengers per day, the project would have a capacity of 176 buses running through 33 stations along Bulacao until Talamban with a link to South Road Properties. The project is currently branded as TransCebu and is expected to be fully operational by 2017.  it was two years late, and the price had increased to ₱9.04B (US$180M).

In March 2019, the Land Transportation Franchising and Regulatory Board announced the opening of a new Premium Point-to-Point Bus Service in Cebu City with three express bus routes to Lapu-Lapu, Danao and Sibonga.

A new light railway is expected to start its construction in 2022.

Utilities

The city mostly gets its power from an interconnection grid with the Leyte Geothermal Power Plant, which also powers the majority of the Visayas. Cebu is also powered by a coal-fired thermal plant with two units each generating 52.5-MW and 56.8-MW, a 43.8-MW diesel power plant and 55-MW land-based gas turbine plants located at the Naga power complex which is planned to be rehabilitated and replaced with 150-MW coal units by 2016 and to be completed by 2019.

Telecommunication facilities, broadband and wireless internet connections are available and are provided by some of the country's largest telecommunication companies.

In 1998, the  Inayawan Sanitary Landfill was constructed to ease garbage disposal within the city. After 15 years, the landfill reached its lifespan and the Talisay city government recently allowed Cebu to temporarily dump its garbage in its own  landfill. In 2015, Cebu appropriated a total of ₱2.5M to close and rehabilitate the landfill at Inayawan.

Education

Cebu City, and Metro Cebu as a whole, is an important educational hub in Southern Philippines. Cebu City itself is currently home to ten large universities each with a number of campuses throughout Cebu province and more than a dozen other schools specializing in various courses.

Among these schools is the University of San Carlos, one of the most highly regarded educational institutions in the Philippines. It claims to trace its roots to Colegio de San Ildefonso, which was founded in 1595. It has five campuses around Cebu City, including the Downtown Campus (formerly Main Campus) and the Talamban Campus (TC), both of which are home to the school's college programs. It is currently headed by the Society of the Divine Word.

The University of the Philippines Cebu, located at Barangay Camputhaw in the district near Lahug currently has eight courses and has plans of expansion and development. The U.P. Board of Regents elevated the status of U.P. Cebu as a constituent university of the University of the Philippines System on October 27, 2016.

Another Catholic university in Cebu City is the University of San Jose–Recoletos which was established in 1947. It is currently headed by the Augustinian Recollects and has two different campuses within the city, excluding a new campus outside the city located in the municipality of Balamban.

Cebu Normal University (CNU) was established in 1902 as a provincial normal school, a branch of the Philippine Normal School. It became an independent institution in 1924, a chartered college in 1976, and a university in 1998. CNU offers academic programs at the nursery, kindergarten, elementary, junior high, undergraduate, and graduate levels. CNU is designated by the Commission on Higher Education (CHED) as Center of Excellence (COE) in both Nursing Education and Teacher Education.

The Cebu Doctors' University (formerly Cebu Doctors' College) was granted university status in November 2004. It is the only private school in the Philippines to achieve university status without a designated basic education (pre-school – high school) curriculum; it caters mainly to courses related to the health services field. It was relocated to a nine-story building in 2007 at the Cebu Boardwalk (now Dr. P.V. Larrazabal Jr. Avenue) in neighboring city of Mandaue, thus closing its old campus near the then Cebu Doctors' Hospital (now Cebu Doctors' University Hospital). , the university now offers senior high school (grades 11 and 12)

The University of Cebu (UC) has four campuses located within the city: Its main campus, located in Sanciangko Street, offers degree programs such as a Bachelor of Science in Information Technology (BSIT), HRM, Computer Engineering, BSED and others. The Maritime Education & Training Center (METC), located in Barangay Mambaling, which hosts the university's maritime programs, was opened in 1991. Its third campus, in Barangay Banilad, was opened in June 2002. A fourth campus, the Pardo–Talisay campus, located in Barangay Bulacao Pardo, near the boundary between Cebu City and Talisay, was added to the UC network in 2021 after the university's acquisition of St. Paul College Foundation, Inc.

Also located within in the city is the University of the Visayas, established in 1919, and is considered to be the first educational institution in Cebu which was granted with a university status. It was granted an autonomous status by the Commission on Higher Education (CHED) in 2010 and currently offers basic education and a number of courses in the tertiary level including medical courses (Medicine, Nursing, Dentistry, Pharmacy, Midwifery, and Health Care Services) which are housed in its campus in Banilad area. Aside from its campuses within Cebu City, it also has numerous campuses located around the province of Cebu.

Other noteworthy institutions in the city include the Cebu Institute of Technology – University (formerly Cebu Institute of Technology), the main campus of Cebu Technological University (formerly the Cebu State College of Science and Technology), Southwestern University, University of Southern Philippines Foundation in Lahug and Mabini, Asian College of Technology (formerly Asian Computer Institute), Benedicto College, Cebu Eastern College, Cebu International School, Colegio de la Inmaculada Concepcion, College of Technological Sciences - Cebu, Don Bosco Technical College–Cebu (DBTC), Saint Theresa's College of Cebu, Sacred Heart School - Ateneo de Cebu, Salazar Colleges of Science and Institute of Technology, and Velez College (together with its independently administered medical school arm Cebu Institute of Medicine), among others.

Cebu City has 68 public elementary schools, 23 national high schools and 28 night high schools. These night high schools are operated by the city government.

The Cebu City Public Library and Information Center is the only public library in Cebu.

Sister cities
International (in alphabetical order of the names of the cities)

National

Notable personalities

See also

List of parishes in Cebu
List of people from Cebu
Roman Catholic Archdiocese of Cebu
Metro Cebu

Notes

References

Sources

External links
 
 
 
 [ Philippine Standard Geographic Code]
 Cebu City on SharePhilippines.com 
 Historic photographs of Cebu city

 
1565 establishments in the Philippines
Cities in Cebu
Former national capitals
Highly urbanized cities in the Philippines
Populated coastal places in the Philippines
Populated places established in 1565
Port cities and towns in the Philippines
Provincial capitals of the Philippines